Mitsuhashi (written: 三橋 lit. "three bridges") is a Japanese surname. Notable people with the surname include:

, Japanese field hockey player
, Japanese volleyball player
, Japanese entomologist
, Japanese voice actress
, Japanese badminton player
Tatsuya Mitsuhashi (born 1973), Japanese golfer

See also
Mitsuhashi, Fukuoka, a former town in Fukuoka Prefecture, Japan

Japanese-language surnames